Natasha Rosa Figueiredo (born February 16, 1996) is a Brazilian professional weightlifter who earned a spot at the 2020 Summer Olympics in the 49kg category. She finished in 9th place in the women's 49 kg event. She won the bronze medal in her event at the 2022 Pan American Weightlifting Championships held in Bogotá, Colombia.

Career

Figueiredo competed in the 2020 Summer Olympics in the 49kg competition. She nearly did not make it due to minor doping violations, but was eventually cleared to compete after her case went to arbitration.

She won the silver medal in her event at the 2022 South American Games held in Asunción, Paraguay. she competed in the women's 49kg event at the 2022 World Weightlifting Championships held in Bogotá, Colombia.

Achievements

References

External links
 

1996 births
Living people
Brazilian female weightlifters
Weightlifters at the 2020 Summer Olympics
Sportspeople from Rio de Janeiro (city)
Olympic weightlifters of Brazil
Pan American Weightlifting Championships medalists
South American Games silver medalists for Brazil
South American Games medalists in weightlifting
Competitors at the 2022 South American Games
21st-century Brazilian women